Petros Velissariou (Greek: Πέτρος Βελισσαρίου; born April 20, 1993) is a Greek professional basketball player. He is 1.90 m (6 ft 2 ¾ in) tall.

Club career
After playing youth basketball at Mantoulidis, Velissariou started his playing career in 2012, playing with Kavala.

References

External links
Greek League Profile 
FIBA Profile (Game Center)
Draftexpress.com Profile
Eurobasket.com Profile

1993 births
Living people
Greek men's basketball players
Greek Basket League players
Kavala B.C. players
Machites Doxas Pefkon B.C. players
Point guards
Basketball players from Thessaloniki